Leto is a surname. Notable people with the surname include:
Antonio Leto (1844–1913), Italian painter
Jared Leto (born 1971), actor and singer of band Thirty Seconds to Mars
Julie Elizabeth Leto, American writer of romance novels
Julius Pomponius Laetus or Pomponius Leto (1425–1498), Italian humanist
Marco Leto (1931–2016),  Italian film and television director and screenwriter
Norman Leto (born 1980), Polish artist
Peter Leto, American television director and television producer
Sebastián Leto (born 1986), Argentinian footballer
Shannon Leto (born 1970), American drummer of band Thirty Seconds to Mars